The following lists note recordings in opera and recital of soprano Jessye Norman.

Discography

Opera
Norman sang many roles in audio recordings of complete operas:
Bartók, Bluebeard's Castle (A Kékszakállú herceg vára, Sz. 48, op. 11) (Judith), cond. Pierre Boulez, with László Polgár (1993 ; Deutsche Grammophon, 1998)
Beethoven, Fidelio (Leonore), cond. Bernard Haitink (Philips)
Berlioz, Les Troyens (Cassandre/Didon), cond. James Levine (Met Opera on Demand, performance of 18 February 1984) 
Bizet, Carmen (Carmen), cond. Seiji Ozawa, with Neil Shicoff and Mirella Freni (Philips)
Debussy, L'enfant prodigue (Lia), cond. Gary Bertini, with José Carreras and Dietrich Fischer-Dieskau (Orfeo)
Fauré, Pénélope (Pénélope), cond. Charles Dutoit with Alain Vanzo and José van Dam (Erato)
Gluck, Alceste (Alceste), cond. Serge Baudo, with Nicolai Gedda and Siegmund Nimsgern (Orfeo)
Haydn, Armida (Armida), cond. Antal Doráti (Philips)
Haydn, La vera Costanza (Rosina), cond. Antal Doráti (Philips)
Mascagni, Cavalleria rusticana (Santuzza), cond. Semyon Bychkov, with Dmitri Hvorostovsky (Philips)
Meyerbeer, L'Africaine (Sélica), cond. Riccardo Muti (live in Florence, 1971) (Opera d'oro)
Mozart, Idomeneo (Idamante), cond. Colin Davis, with Heather Harper and Nicolai Gedda (live in Rome, 25 March 1971) (Opera d'oro)
Mozart, Die Gärtnerin aus Liebe, German version of La finta giardiniera (Arminda), cond. Hans Schmidt-Isserstedt, with Helen Donath, Werner Hollweg, Ileana Cotrubas, Hermann Prey and Tatiana Troyanos (Philips)
Mozart, Le nozze di Figaro (Countess), cond. Colin Davis, with Mirella Freni (Philips)
Offenbach, La belle Hélène (Hélène), cond. Michel Plasson with Gabriel Bacquier and Jean-Philippe Lafont (EMI)
Offenbach, Les contes d'Hoffmann (Giulietta), cond. Sylvain Cambreling, with Neil Shicoff and José van Dam (EMI)
Offenbach, Les contes d'Hoffmann (Antonia), cond. Jeffrey Tate, with Anne-Sofie von Otter, Francisco Araiza, Samuel Ramey and Cheryl Studer (Philips)
Purcell, Dido and Aeneas (Dido), cond. Raymond Leppard (Philips)
Schoenberg, Erwartung, cond. James Levine (Philips)
Strauss, Ariadne auf Naxos (Primadonna/Ariadne), cond. Kurt Masur, with Julia Varady, Dietrich Fischer-Dieskau, Edita Gruberova  (Philips)
Strauss, Salome (Salome), cond. Seiji Ozawa, with James Morris (Philips)
Stravinski, Œdipus Rex (Jocaste), cond. Seiji Ozawa, with Peter Schreier, Bryn Terfel and Georges Wilson (narrator) (Philips)
Stravinski, Œdipus Rex (Jocaste), cond. Colin Davis, with Thomas Moser, Siegmund Nimsgern and Michel Piccoli (narrator) (Orfeo)
Verdi, Il corsaro (Medora), cond. Lamberto Gardelli, with Montserrat Caballé and José Carreras (Philips)
Verdi, Un giorno di regno (Giulietta), cond. Lamberto Gardelli, with Fiorenza Cossotto and José Carreras (Philips)
Verdi, Aida (Aida), cond. Nino Sanzogno, with Fiorenza Cossotto (live, Paris, 1973 – Opera d'oro)
Wagner, Isoldes Liebestod, cond. Herbert von Karajan (live, Salzburg, 1987 – Deutsche Grammophon)
Wagner, Opera Scenes (Tristan und Isolde – Prelude and Liebestod, Tannhäuser – Elisabeth, extr. acts 2 & 3, The Flying Dutchman – extr. act 2, Götterdämmerung – final scene), cond. Klaus Tennstedt (EMI)
Wagner, Lohengrin (Elsa), cond. Georg Solti, with Plácido Domingo (Decca)
Wagner, Die Walküre (Sieglinde), cond. James Levine, with Gary Lakes, James Morris, Hildegard Behrens and Christa Ludwig (Deutsche Grammophon)
Wagner, Die Walküre (Sieglinde), cond. Marek Janowski, with Siegfried Jerusalem, Kurt Moll and Theo Adam (RCA)
Wagner, Parsifal (Kundry), cond. James Levine, with Plácido Domingo (Deutsche Grammophon)
Weber, Euryanthe (Euryanthe), cond. Marek Janowski, with Nicolai Gedda (Berlin Classics)

Lieder, songs
Berg, Sieben frühe Lieder, Altenberg Lieder, London Symphony Orchestra, cond. Pierre Boulez — Jugendlieder, Zwei Lieder, Ann Schein (piano) (Sony)
Berg, Der Wein, New York Philharmonic, cond. Pierre Boulez (Sony)
Berlioz, Cléopâtre, Orchestre de Paris, cond. Daniel Barenboim (Deutsche Grammophon)
Berlioz, Les Nuits d'été, London Symphony Orchestra, cond. Colin Davis (Philips)
Berlioz, Roméo et Juliette, Philadelphia Orchestra, cond. Riccardo Muti (EMI)
Brahms, Lieder, piano Daniel Barenboim (Deutsche Grammophon)
Brahms, Lieder, piano Geoffrey Parsons (Philips)
Brahms, Rhapsodie pour alto, Philadelphia Orchestra, cond. Riccardo Muti (Philips)
Chausson, Poème de l'amour et de la mer, Chanson perpétuelle, Mélodies, Monte-Carlo Philharmonic Orchestra, cond. Armin Jordan, piano Michel Dalberto (Erato)
Duparc, Mélodies, piano Dalton Baldwin (in Les Chemins de l'amour, Philips)
Mahler, Lieder eines fahrenden Gesellen, Berliner Philharmoniker, cond. Bernard Haitink (Philips)
Mahler, Kindertotenlieder, Boston Symphony Orchestra, cond. Seiji Ozawa (Philips)
Mahler, Das Lied von der Erde, London Symphony Orchestra, cond. Colin Davis, with Jon Vickers (Philips)
Mahler, Das Lied von der Erde, Berliner Philharmoniker, cond. James Levine, with Siegfried Jerusalem (Deutsche Grammophon)
Mahler, Des Knaben Wunderhorn, Royal Concertgebouw Orchestra, cond. Bernard Haitink, with John Shirley-Quirk (Philips)
Mahler, Lieder, piano Irwin Gage (in Schubert/Mahler, Philips)
Poulenc, La Fraîcheur et le Feu, Tu vois le feu du soir, piano Irwin Gage (EMI)
Poulenc, Voyage à Paris, Montparnasse, La Grenouillère, Les Chemins de l'amour, piano Dalton Baldwin (in Les Chemins de l'amour, Philips)
Ravel, Shéhérazade, London Symphony Orchestra, cond. Colin Davis (Philips)
Ravel, Chansons madécasses, membres de l'Ensemble intercontemporain, cond. Pierre Boulez (Sony)
Ravel, Chansons madécasses, Chanson du rouet, piano Dalton Baldwin, cello Renaud Fontanarosa, flute Michel Debost (EMI)
Ravel, Deux mélodies hébraïques, piano Dalton Baldwin (in Les Chemins de l'amour, Philips)
Satie, La Statue de bronze, Daphénéo, Le Chapelier, Je te veux, piano Dalton Baldwin (in Les Chemins de l'amour, Philips)
Schoenberg, Brettl-Lieder, piano James Levine (Philips)
Schoenberg, Gurrelieder (Tove), Boston Symphony Orchestra, cond. Seiji Ozawa with Tatiana Troyanos and James McCracken (Philips)
Schoenberg, Lied der Waldtaube, Ensemble intercontemporain, cond. Pierre Boulez (Sony)
Schubert, Lieder, piano Phillip Moll (Philips)
Schubert, Lieder, piano Irwin Gage (in Schubert/Mahler, Philips)
Schumann, Frauenliebe und Leben, Liederkreis op. 39, piano Irwin Gage (Philips)
Strauss, Vier letzte Lieder, and other Lieder with orchestra, Leipzig Gewandhaus Orchestra, cond. Kurt Masur (Philips)
Strauss, Lieder, piano Geoffrey Parsons (Philips)
Wagner, Wesendonck Lieder and Isoldes Liebestod, London Symphony Orchestra, cond. Colin Davis (Philips)
Wagner, Wesendonck Lieder, BBC Symphony Orchestra, cond. Pierre Boulez (live, Londres, BBC Proms, 1974 – Gala)
Wagner, two Wesendonck Lieder : "Schmerzen" et "Träume", BBC Symphony Orchestra, cond. Colin Davis (live, London, Royal Albert Hall, 1972, included in the CD The Last Night of the Proms, Philips)
Wagner, Wesendonck Lieder, piano Irwin Gage (EMI)
Schubert/Mahler: Lieder, piano Irwin Gage (Philips)
Les Chemins de l'amour (Duparc, Ravel, Poulenc, Satie), piano Dalton Baldwin (Philips)
Tchaikovsky Gala in Leningrad, cond. Yuri Temirkanov, with Itzhak Perlman and Yo-Yo Ma : Chansons françaises op. 65, n° 1 "Sérénade" & 6 "Rondel" ; "Adieu, forêts", extr. de La Pucelle d'Orléans (live, Leningrad, 1990 – RCA)
Jessye Norman: Edinburgh International Festival 1972 (Brahms, Ravel, Schubert, Strauss) (Arkadia)
An Evening with Jessye Norman (Purcell, Wagner-Wesendonck Lieder, Mahler-Rückert Lieder, Ravel-Mélodies hébraïques, Spitituals, Wolf, Debussy), piano Irwin Gage (non mentionné sur le cd) (live, années 70 – Opera d'oro)
Live at Hohenems (1987) (Haendel, Schumann, Schubert, Brahms, Strauss, Spirituals), piano Geoffrey Parsons (Philips)
Jessye Norman Live – Geoffrey Parsons (1987) (Haydn, Haendel, Berg, Mahler, Strauss, Spirituals, Ravel) (Philips)
Salzburg Recital (1990) (Beethoven, Hugo Wolf, Debussy), piano James Levine (Philips)
La Marseillaise, dir. Semyon Bychkov (Philips, 1989, bicentenaire de la Révolution française)

Symphonies, masses, oratorios
Beethoven, Missa Solemnis, Wiener Philharmoniker, cond. James Levine with Cheryl Studer, Plácido Domingo and Kurt Moll (Deutsche Grammophon)
Beethoven, Symphony No. 9, Wiener Philharmoniker, cond. Karl Böhm, with Brigitte Fassbaender, Plácido Domingo and Walter Berry (Deutsche Grammophon)
Beethoven, Symphony No. 9, Chicago Symphony Orchestra, cond. Georg Solti, with Reinhild Runkel, Robert Schunk and Hans Sotin (Decca)
Brahms, A German Requiem (Ein deutsches Requiem), London Philharmonic Orchestra, cond. Klaus Tennstedt, with Jorma Hynninen (EMI)
Bruckner, Te Deum, Chicago Symphony Orchestra, cond. Daniel Barenboim, with Samuel Ramey, David Rendall and Yvonne Minton (Deutsche Grammophon)
Franck, Les Béatitudes (oratorio), Bavarian Radio Symphony Orchestra, cond. Rafael Kubelik, with Brigitte Fassbaender, René Kollo, Dietrich Fischer-Dieskau (Gala)
Mahler, Symphony No. 2, Orchestre philharmonique de Vienne, cond. Lorin Maazel, with Eva Marton (Sony)
Mahler, Symphony No. 2, Musicians against Nuclear Arms Orchestra, cond. Leonard Bernstein, with Barbara Hendricks (live, Washington, 1984, Rare Moth)
Mahler, Symphony No. 3, Wiener Philharmoniker, cond. Claudio Abbado (Deustche Grammophon)
Mahler, Symphony No. 3, Boston Symphony Orchestra, cond. Seiji Ozawa (Philips)
Tippett, A Child of Our Time (oratorio), BBC Symphony Orchestra, cond. Colin Davis, with Janet Baker and John Shirley-Quirk (Philips)
Verdi, Messa da Requiem, Bavarian Radio Symphony Orchestra & Chorus, cond. Riccardo Muti, with Agnes Baltsa, José Carreras, Yevgeny Nesterenko (live, Munich, 1981, BR Klassik)

Others
Spirituals, piano Dalton Baldwin (Philips)
Spirituals in concert, cond. James Levine, with Kathleen Battle (live, New York – Deutsche Grammophon)
With a song in my heart (Richard Rodgers, Cole Porter, Jerome Kern ...) (Philips)
Lucky to be me (Leonard Bernstein, George Gershwin, Kurt Weill, Michel Legrand, Billy Joel, Richard Rodgers) (Philips)
I was born in love with you : Jessye Norman sings Michel Legrand (Philips)
Jessye Norman at Notre-Dame, cond. Lawrence Foster (Philips)
In the Spirit: Sacred Music for Christmas (Philips)
Christmastide (Philips)
Les plus beaux Ave Maria et chants sacrés, cond. Kurt Redel (Philips)
Sacred Songs, cond. Alexander Gibson (Philips)
Amazing Grace (Philips)
Roots: my Life, my Song (Sony)

Video
Berlioz, Les Troyens (Cassandre), cond. James Levine, with Plácido Domingo and Tatiana Troyanos (DVD Deutsche Grammophon-Universal; Met Opera on Demand)
Poulenc, Dialogues des Carmélites, (Madame Lidoine), cond. Manuel Rosenthal, with Maria Ewing, Betsy Norden, and Régine Crespin (Met Opera on Demand)
Strauss, Ariadne auf Naxos (Primadonna/Ariadne), cond. James Levine, with James King, Kathleen Battle and Tatiana Troyanos (DVD Deutsche Grammophon-Universal; Met Opera on Demand)
Stravinsky, Œdipus Rex (Jocaste), cond. Seiji Ozawa, with Philip Langridge and Bryn Terfel (DVD Philips-Universal)
Vangelis, Mythodea: Music for the NASA Mission: 2001 Mars Odyssey, with Kathleen Battle (DVD Sony)
Verdi, Requiem, cond. Claudio Abbado, with Margaret Price, José Carreras and Ruggero Raimondi (DVD Arthaus Musik)
Wagner, Die Walküre (Sieglinde), cond. James Levine, with Gary Lakes, James Morris, Hildegard Behrens and Christa Ludwig (DVD Deutsche Grammophon-Universal; Met Opera on Demand)
Wagner, Isoldes Liebestod, dir. Herbert von Karajan (+ an extract of the rehearsal), in Karajan in Salzburg (VHS Deutsche Grammophon)
Jessye Norman sings Carmen, cond. Seiji Ozawa (DVD Philips)
Hohenems Recital (Haendel, Schumann, Schubert, Brahms, Strauss, Spirituals), piano Geoffrey Parsons (VHS Philips)
Spirituals in concert, cond. James Levine, with Kathleen Battle (VHS Deutsche Grammophon)
The Seattle Symphony Orchestra Live From Benaroya Hall, cond. Gerard Schwarz (VHS Lark)
Jessye Norman at Christmas (concert à Notre-Dame de Paris), cond. Lawrence Foster (DVD Philips-Universal)
Christmastide (VHS Philips)
Amazing Grace with Bill Moyers (VHS)
Symphony for the Spire, with Plácido Domingo, Kenneth Brannagh, Ofra Harnoy and Charlton Heston (DVD Warner)
The People's Passion: A Musical for Easter, with Thomas Allen (DVD Warner)
Marian Anderson (VHS Kultur Video)
Jessye Norman: A Portrait (DVD Decca-Universal)

References

External links  

Norman, Jessye